Telugu Language Day (IAST: Telugu bhāṣā dinōtsavaṁ;  "Day of the Telugu Language") is observed on 29 August each year in the states of Andhra Pradesh and Telangana of the Republic of India. This date was chosen to coincide with the birthday of the Telugu poet Gidugu Venkata Ramamurthy. The Government of Andhra Pradesh provides funds and presents awards with the objective of the betterment of the Telugu language. The Department of Culture is responsible for organising the day on behalf of the government.

See also
World Telugu Conference
Telugu New Year

References

Telugu language
August observances
Language observances
Observances in India